Daria Snigur was the defending champion, but lost in the first round to Rebecca Šramková.

Elsa Jacquemot won the title, defeating Magdalena Fręch in the final, 7–5, 6–2.

Seeds

Draw

Finals

Top half

Bottom half

References

External Links
Main Draw

Al Habtoor Tennis Challenge - Singles